Christo's Valley Curtain is a 1974 American short documentary film directed by Albert and David Maysles, about Christo and Jeanne-Claude's Valley Curtain project.

Accolades
It was nominated for an Academy Award for Best Documentary Short.

References

External links
Christo’s Valley Curtain at Maysles Films

The Screen: 'Christo's Valley Curtain' Is a Real Tall Story-New York Times review by Vincent Canby

1974 films
1970s short documentary films
American short documentary films
Documentary films about visual artists
Films directed by Albert and David Maysles
Films set in Colorado
Films shot in Colorado
Documentary films about Colorado
1970s English-language films
1970s American films